A Brief History... is the fifth album and first live album by Australian folk band The Waifs, first released by Jarrah in 2004.

Track listing

Disk one
"Lighthouse" – 4:17
"London Still" – 4:29
"Take It In" – 3:40
"Love Serenade" – 3:11
"The Waitress" – 4:00
"Fisherman's Daughter" – 6:35
"Papa" – 2:58
"Crazy Train" – 8:02
"Brain Damage" – 4:59
"Don't Think Twice, It's Alright" – 3:18
"Lies" – 4:43
"Haircut" – 4:23
"The River" – 4:02
"Gillian" – 4:41
"A Brief History..." – 5:03
"Bridal Train (studio version)" – 4:21

Disk two
"Willow Tree" – 4:06
"When I Die (introduction)" – 0:40
"When I Die" – 4:28
"Sunflower Man" – 4:11
"Flesh And Blood" – 5:16
"Highway One" – 5:17
"Bridal Train (introduction)" – 0:35
"Bridal Train" – 4:20
"Since I've Been Around" – 4:44
"Here If You Want" – 3:53
"Billy Jones" – 4:15
"Company" – 4:16
"Spotlight" – 5:46
"Shelter Me" – 3:12
"Shiny Apple" – 3:16
"Crazy/Circles" – 9:51

All songs by the members of the Waifs, with the exception of "Crazy/Circles", which was written by Willie Nelson and The Waifs and "Don't Think Twice, It's Alright", which was written by Bob Dylan.

Personnel

Musical
Josh Cunningham – Guitar, Vocals
Donna Simpson – Guitar, Vocals, Photography
Vikki Simpson – Guitar, Harmonica, Vocals
Jen Anderson – Violin
Ben Franz – Guitar (Bass), Photography

Technical
Philip Barlow – Photography
James Cadsky – Engineer
Joseph Carra – Mastering
Simon Cowling – Photography, Cover Photo
Jill Furmanovsky – Photography
James Hewgill – Engineer
Sam Hickey – Design
Anton Koch – Engineer, Live Sound, Live Sound Engineer
Kit Luce – Photography
Steven Schram – Engineer, Assistant
Ellen Smith – Photography
Phil Stevens – Photography, Management
Chris Thompson – Engineer, Mixing
Kathy Wade – Photography
The Waifs – Producer, Photography

Charts

Certifications

References

External links
Official site

The Waifs albums
2004 live albums